E. orientalis  may refer to:
 Eleutherodactylus orientalis, a frog species endemic to Cuba
 Erioptera orientalis, a crane fly species in the genus Erioptera
 Ervatamia orientalis, a plant species in the genus Ervatamia found in Australia
 Erythrina orientalis, a plant species
 Eudynamys orientalis, the Pacific koel or Eastern koel, a cuckoo species found from Wallacea east to the Solomon Island and south to northern and eastern Australia
 Eurystomus orientalis, the Oriental dollarbird or dollar roller, a bird species

Synonyms
 Erigone orientalis, a synonym for Hylyphantes graminicola, a small spider species with palaearctic distribution

See also
 Orientalis (disambiguation)